Franklin Molina (born August 28, 1984) is a male professional road cyclist from Venezuela.

Career

2009
1st in V Válida Rescatando el Ciclismo Aragüeño (VEN)
1st in Stage 1 Vuelta al Estado Portugesa, Guanaré (VEN)
1st in General Classification Vuelta al Estado Portugesa (VEN)

References
 
Venezuelan cyclists

1984 births
Living people
Venezuelan male cyclists
Place of birth missing (living people)
21st-century Venezuelan people